is a former Japanese football player and manager.

Playing career
Kiyokawa was born in Hokkaido on June 3, 1967. After graduating from high school, he had a long-time bond with Kashiwa Reysol, for which he played during pre-J1 League era as Hitachi.

Coaching career
After retiring, Kiyokawa became a youth team coach at Kashiwa Reysol. He then moved to Kumamoto, where he has been a coach for Roasso Kumamoto for six seasons before being appointed as head coach in 2016 season. He resigned in June 2017 when the club was at the 19th place of 22 clubs.

Managerial statistics

References

External links
 
 Profile at Roasso Kumamoto 

1973 births
Living people
Association football people from Hokkaido
Japanese footballers
Japan Soccer League players
Japan Football League (1992–1998) players
Kashiwa Reysol players
Japanese football managers
J2 League managers
Roasso Kumamoto managers
Association football forwards